Katrina Kendall (born 1989) is a Filipino-British environmental ambassador, scientist and former beauty queen, best known for winning Miss Earth England 2015 which gave her the right to represent England in Miss Earth 2015 pageant.

Biography

Education and Research
Katrina holds a first class honours master's degree (MChem Hons) from the University of Edinburgh specializing in Environmental and Sustainable Chemistry. During her degree she carried out research on green chemistry for hydrogen storage at EPFL in Switzerland. The said research earned her a First Class grade. Her research group was featured in L’Illustre Magazine, article titled The Future Starts Here.

Katrina embarked on a career in consulting and business development within financial services, technology and sustainability. She travelled with her career to London, Paris, Philippines, Geneva, Singapore and Hong Kong.

Katrina currently is pursuing a PhD at the University of Oxford in nature-based solutions for climate change, biodiversity loss and other Sustainable Development Goals.

Miss Earth England 2015
Katrina joined the Miss Earth England 2015 pageant where she represented Southwest London. The pageant took place on 29 August 2015 at the Burlington Hotel in Birmingham. She was declared as the England's winner for 2015.

Aside from winning the main title, Katrina also got the Best Online Profile and became part of the top 5 Eco Interview segment.

Miss Earth 2015
Winning Miss Earth England for 2015, Katrina is England's representative to be Miss Earth 2015 and would try to succeed Jamie Herrell as the next Miss Earth.

Environmental Ambassador
Katrina was chosen to be the ambassador for a multitude of environmental causes ranging from biodiversity conservation, to ocean protection, to cultural heritage preservation.
She has been asked to join the international Climate Justice campaign by Greenpeace, and invited to be a panellist speaker at the IUCN World Conservation Congress 2016 in Hawai'i.

She currently holds ambassadress positions for Oceana Philippines, the Mt. Kitanglad Range Natural Park (ASEAN Heritage Park) and Mt. Kalatungan Range Natural Park (both Parks are in Bukidnon).

In 2016 the British Council selected her to be an 'Active Citizen Leader for Social Impact'.

References

External links
Official Website
Katrina at Miss Earth UK website
University of Oxford website

1989 births
Living people
People from London
Miss Earth 2015 contestants
English beauty pageant winners
English people of Filipino descent